South Tyrone was a UK Parliament constituency in Ireland which returned one Member of Parliament from 1885 to 1922, using the first past the post electoral system.

Boundaries and Boundary Changes
This county constituency comprised the southern part of County Tyrone.

Prior to the 1885 redistribution the area was part of the Tyrone constituency. From 1922 it formed part of the Fermanagh and Tyrone constituency.

1885–1918: The baronies of Clogher and Dungannon Lower, and that part of the barony of Dungannon Middle consisting of the parishes of Clonfeacle and Donaghmore.

1918–1922: The rural district of Clogher, that part of the rural district of Cookstown consisting of the district electoral divisions of The Sandholes and Stewartstown, that part of the rural district of Dungannon not contained in the North East Tyrone constituency, that part of the rural district of Omagh consisting of the district electoral divisions of Carryglass, Derrybard, Dervaghroy, Draughton, Fallaghearn, Fintona, Seskinore and Tattymoyle, and the urban district of Dungannon.

Politics
The constituency was a majority unionist area. Sinn Féin and the Independent Nationalist candidate together polled about 2,500 votes less than the Unionist received in 1918.

The First Dáil
The constituencies in the 1918 Westminster election, including South Tyrone, also served as the constituencies of the First Dáil, established by Sinn Féin as the parliament of its self-proclaimed Irish Republic. While in theory all Irish Westminster MPs were entitled to sit in the Dáil, in practice only Sinn Féin members attended, and South Tyrone's William Coote was listed on the roll as "as láthair" [absent]. The Second Dáil used the single transferable vote constituencies of the 1921 home rule elections, in which the territory previously in South Tyrone was part of the eight-member House of Commons of Northern Ireland constituency of Fermanagh and Tyrone.

Members of Parliament

Elections

Elections in the 1880s

Elections in the 1890s

Elections in the 1900s

Elections in the 1910s

References

Sources

Citations

External links
 https://www.oireachtas.ie/en/members/
 https://www.oireachtas.ie/en/debates/

See also
 List of UK Parliament Constituencies in Ireland and Northern Ireland
 Redistribution of Seats (Ireland) Act 1918
 List of MPs elected in the 1918 United Kingdom general election
 List of Dáil Éireann constituencies in Ireland (historic)
 Members of the 1st Dáil

Westminster constituencies in County Tyrone (historic)
Dáil constituencies in Northern Ireland (historic)
Constituencies of the Parliament of the United Kingdom established in 1885
Constituencies of the Parliament of the United Kingdom disestablished in 1922